Krum Rock ( \'kru-mov 'ka-m&k\) is a small nunatak rising to 208 metres on the southwest edge of Balkan Snowfield just north of Contell Glacier on Hurd Peninsula in eastern Livingston Island, one of the South Shetland Islands in Western Antarctica. The rock projects slightly above the ice sheet with some 3,000 square metres of rocky ground exposed on its northern slope in summer. Because of its location rather than prominence, it is a particularly important landmark in the course of field work carried out in the area.

Location

Krum Rock is named for Krum Velchev, meteorologist at St. Kliment Ohridski Base for several seasons since 1993. The name form Krumov Kamak was well established in use at the time of approval.

Maps
 Isla Livingston: Península Hurd. Mapa topográfico de escala 1:25000. Madrid: Servicio Geográfico del Ejército, 1991. (Map reproduced on p. 16 of the linked work)
 L.L. Ivanov. Livingston Island: Central-Eastern Region. Scale 1:25000 topographic map.  Sofia: Antarctic Place-names Commission of Bulgaria, 1996.
 L.L. Ivanov et al. Antarctica: Livingston Island and Greenwich Island, South Shetland Islands. Scale 1:100000 topographic map. Sofia: Antarctic Place-names Commission of Bulgaria, 2005.
 L.L. Ivanov. Antarctica: Livingston Island and Greenwich, Robert, Snow and Smith Islands. Scale 1:120000 topographic map.  Troyan: Manfred Wörner Foundation, 2009.  
 Antarctic Digital Database (ADD). Scale 1:250000 topographic map of Antarctica. Scientific Committee on Antarctic Research (SCAR). Since 1993, regularly upgraded and updated.
 L.L. Ivanov. Antarctica: Livingston Island and Smith Island. Scale 1:100000 topographic map. Manfred Wörner Foundation, 2017.

References
 Krum Rock. SCAR Composite Antarctic Gazetteer
 Bulgarian Antarctic Gazetteer. Antarctic Place-names Commission. (details in Bulgarian, basic data in English)

Mountains of Livingston Island
Nunataks of Livingston Island